A miniature park is a display of miniature buildings and models, usually as a recreational and tourist attraction open to the public.  A miniature park may contain a model of a single city or town, often called a miniature city or model village, or it can contain a number of different sets of models.

History

There is evidence to suggest the existence of private model villages and miniature parks since the 19th century, but it was only in the 1930s to 1950s that the genre became tourist attractions. Early examples include Bekonscot in the UK and Madurodam in The Hague.

Variations on a theme
Most model villages and parks are built to a consistent scale; varying from 1:76 as used by the intricately detailed Pendon in England up to the 1:9 scale of Wimborne Model Town.

There has been a move away from the model village concept since the mid- to late 20th century towards a miniature park concept. Model villages are typically larger-scale, sit in a cohesive miniature landscape and allow viewing and physical interaction with the exhibits, such as publicly accessed streets and urban areas. Miniature parks however, are primarily concerned with the display of exhibits in their own right, viewed from a distance. Model railways, rivers and roads may provide a continuation between miniature parks exhibits.

List of notable miniature parks

Europe

Austria
 Minimundus, Klagenfurt

Belgium
 Mini-Europe, Brussels

Denmark
 Legoland Billund, Billund (the original Legoland)
Many danish towns also have extensive miniature towns from historic periods (normally 1900s). Some of the most significant include:
 , Fredericia (circa 1849)
 , Køge (circa 1865)
 , Varde (circa 1866)
 , Kolding (circa 1860-1870)

France
 France Miniature, Élancourt
 Mini World Lyon
 Storybook Land Canal Boats, Disneyland Park (Paris)

Germany
 Legoland Deutschland, Günzburg, Bavaria
 Miniatur Wunderland, Hamburg (indoor)

Italy
 Italia in miniatura, Rimini

Netherlands
 Madurodam, The Hague

Portugal
 Portugal dos Pequenitos, Coimbra

Russia
 Grand Maket Rossiya, Saint Petersburg (indoor)

Slovakia
 Park miniatúr, Podolie

Spain
 Catalunya en Miniatura, Catalunya

Switzerland
 Swiss Vapeur Parc, Valais

Ukraine
 Kyiv in Miniature

United Kingdom
 Babbacombe Model Village, Babbacombe, Devon
 Bekonscot, Beaconsfield, Buckinghamshire
 Bourton-on-the-Water model village, Bourton-on-the-Water, Gloucestershire
 Haigh Hall Miniature Railway, Wigan
 Legoland Windsor in Windsor
 Pendon Museum, Pendon, Oxfordshire
 Southport Model Railway Village
 Tucktonia, Dorset, closed in 1985
 Wimborne Model Town

Americas

Canada
 Canadia Niagara Falls, Ontario, opened in 1966 - closed
 Cullen Gardens and Miniature Village, Whitby, Ontario, opened in 1980 - closed in the mid-2000s
 Little Canada, Toronto, Ontario, opened in 2021
 Woodleigh Replicas, Burlington, Prince Edward Island, closed
 Tivoli Miniature World, Jordan, Ontario, closed in the 1990s

Chile 
 , Santiago, Chile

United States
 Tiny Town, Morrison, Colorado, opened in 1921
 Tiny Town, Springfield, Missouri, opened in 1925
 Miniature Railroad & Village, Pittsburgh, Pennsylvania opened 1920s
 Ave Maria Grotto, Cullman, Alabama, opened in 1933
 Roadside America, Pennsylvania, opened in 1935
 Storybook Land Canal Boats, Disneyland, California opened in 1956
 Palestine Park, Chautauqua Institution in Chautauqua, New York
 Splendid China (Florida), opened in 1993, closed 2003
 Holy Land Experience, Orlando, Florida, the park has a scale model of Jerusalem, Israel
 Forbidden Gardens, Katy, Texas, opened in 1997, closed 2011
 Living Desert Zoo and Gardens, Palm Desert, California, opened in 1971
 San Diego Model Railroad Museum, San Diego, California, opened in 1981
 Legoland California, Carlsbad, California, opened in 1999
 Legoland Florida Winter Haven, opened 2011

Asia/Pacific Region

Australia
 Cockington Green Gardens, Canberra

China
 Splendid China, Shenzhen
 Window of the World, Shenzhen
 Beijing World Park
 Shanghai Urban Planning Exhibition Hall (indoor)
 Grand World Scenic Park, outskirts of Guangzhou, closed

Indonesia
 Taman Mini Indonesia Indah, Jakarta

Japan
 Tobu World Square, Kinugawa Onsen, Nikkō, Tochigi
 Legoland Japan, Nagoya, Aichi

Malaysia
 Islamic Heritage Park, Kuala Terengganu, Terengganu
 Legoland Malaysia, Iskandar Malaysia, Johor
 Tropical Village, Ayer Hitam, Johor

Thailand
 Mini Siam, Pattaya, Chonburi (close in 2023)
 Dusit Thani, Phaya Thai, Bangkok, closed

Middle East

Israel

 Jerusalem’s Model in the Late 2nd Temple Period, Israel Museum, Israel
 Mini Israel, Latrun, Israel

Turkey
 Miniatürk, Istanbul

References

External links
 International Association of Miniature Parks: Almost all members are in Europe.
 Agilitynut feature
 The Gauge One Model Railway Association
 The Miniature Plant Files Database at All Things Miniature